

Types

 catamaran = two symmetric hulls
 proa = two asymmetric hulls, reverse-shunting (interchangeable bow/stern)
 trimaran = three hulls
 quadrimaran = four hulls
 pentamaran = five hulls

Pre-modern Austronesian

 ʻalia
 Amatasi
 Balangay
 Basnigan
 Baurua
 Camakau
 Catamaran
 Drua
 Jukung
 Kaep
 Kalia
 Karakoa
 Kora kora
 Lakana
 Lakatoi
 Ngalawa
 Oruwa
 Outrigger canoe
 Pahi
 Paraw
 Paruwa
 Proa
 Sandeq
 Takia
 Tepukei
 Tipairua
 Tongiaki
 Va'a-tele
 Vaka katea
 Vinta
 Wa
 Yathra doni

Pre-modern Western

 Tessarakonteres and Thalamegos (3rd century BC)
 Simon & Jude or Invention I (1662)
 Invention II (1662)
 Experiment (1664)
 St. Michael the Archangel (1684)
 Experiment (1786)
 Taurus (1790s)

19th century

Jersey (1812)
York (1813)
Nassau (1814)
Steam Battery (1815)
Double Trouble (1820)
Castaliâ (1874)
Amaryllis (1876) 
Calais-Douvres or Express (1877)
Duplex (1877)
Duster (1877)
John Gilpin (1877)
Original (early 19th century) 
Tarantella (1877)
Teaser (1878)
Zarifa (1878)
Proa #1 (1898)

1900s

Proa #2 (1903)
Proa #3 (1903)
Proa #4 (1908)

1930s

Kaimiloa
Kaimiloa-Wakea

1940s

Manu Kai
Naramatac
Shearwater I

1950s

 Aikane
 Ay Ay
 Bunyip 20
 Egg Nog
 Frolic
 Last Pal
 Tangaroa (catamaran)
 Rongo
Shearwater III
 Waikiki Surf
 Wharram catamarans

1960s

 DC‐14 Phantom 
 A Class
 B Class
 C Class
 D Class
 Beverly
 Catalac 9M
 Cheshire 14
 Hellcats II
 Hirondelle Mk I
 Hobie 14  
 Hobie 16
 Isotope
 Kraken 18
 Kraken 25
 Kraken 33
 Kraken 40
 Lodestar
 Pacific Catamaran
 Pen Duick IV or Manureva
 Rehu Moana
 Searunner 25
 Searunner 31
 Searunner 37
 Searunner 40
 Snow Goose
 Stingray catamaran
 Tigercat
 Toria
 Tornado
 Trice
 Trifle
 Trine
 Trio

1970s

 Acapella (Olympus Photo)
 Catalac 8M
 Catalac 10M
 Catalac 12M
 Constant Camber 26
 Constant Camber 32
 Crossbow
 Crossbow II
 Crowther Buccaneer 24
 Crowther Buccaneer 28
 Crowther Buccaneer 33
 Crowther Buccaneer 36
 Crowther Buccaneer 40
 Dart 18
 Farrier Command 10
 Farrier Trailertri 18
 Farrier Trailertri 680
 Farrier Trailertri 720
 FT
 G-Cat 5.0
 Great Britain III
 Hobie 18
 Kaimalino
 Kriter IV
 Miss Nylex
 Nacra 5.2
 Polynesian Concept
 Prindle 18
 Reynolds 21
 Seaclipper 28
 Searunner 34
 Sprint 15
 Stiletto 27
 Sunburner
 Telstar 26 MK1
 Telstar 26 MK2
 Telstar 26 MK3
 Telstar 35
 Telstar 8m
 Third Turtle
 Topcat F1
 Trident 27
 Venta

1980s

 Atlantic 50
 Auscat
 Brittany Ferries
 Casamance 43
 Constant Camber 3M
 Constant Camber 23 Cyclone
 Constant Camber 30
 Constant Camber 35
 Constant Camber 37
 Constant Camber 40
 Constant Camber 44
 Corneel 26
 Dict Robert
 Discovery 20
 Dragonfly 800
 Elf Aquitaine
 Farrier F-27
 Farrier Tramp
 Fidji 39
 Fleury Michon (yacht)
 Fleury Michon IV
 FMV
 Formula Tag
 Gauliosis IV
 Gautier II
 G-Cat 5.7
 Great Britain IV
 Jet Services II
 Jet Services V
 Freshwater class
 First Fleet class
 Hobie 17  
 Juniper
 Lagoon 55
 Lagoon 57
 VSD 2
 Llinase
 Louisiane 37
 Maldives 32
 Matilda
 Matilda II
 Matilda III
 Matilda IV
 Moxie
 Mystère 6.0
 Our Lady Patricia
 Our Lady Pamela
 Paul Ricard
 Phantom 16 (catamaran)
 Prindle 18-2
 RC-27
 Royale II
 Sarimanok
 Seaclipper 10
 Seaclipper 34
 Seaclipper 38
 Seaclipper 41
 Sidinox
 ARC 15
 ARC 17
 ARC 19
 SuperCat 20
 Taipan 4.9
 Topcat Spitfire 2.3
 Topcat Spitfire 2.5
 Trac 14
 Trac 16
 William Saurin

1990s

 Antigua 37
 ARC 22
 Athena 38
 Avalon 8.2
 Avalon 9
 Bahia 46
 Brady 52
 Cable and Wireless Adventurer
 Cat-Link IV
 Cat Link V
 Catalonia
 Catri 26
 Centaurus II
 CityCat
 Condor 10
 Condor 12
 Condor Express
 Condor Vitesse
 Dart 16
 Douce France
 Dragonfly 600
 Dragonfly 1000
 Ducky 13
 Ducky 15
 Emeraude France
 Farrier F-9
 Farrier F-24 Mk II
 Farrier F-31
 Farrier F-36
 Farrier F-82
 Hammerhead 34
 Hoverspeed France
 Incat 045
 Incat 046
 Incat 050
 HarbourCat class
 Hobie Tiger
 Lagoon 35
 Lagoon 37
 Lagoon 380
 Lagoon 410
 Lagoon 42
 Lagoon 47
 Lagoon 470
 Marquises 53
 Marquises 56
 MDV1200
 Mystère 4.3
 Nacra 20
 Open 60
 Phantom 14 (catamaran)
 RC-30
 RV Triton
 Sealion 2000
 RiverCat class
 Scarab 670
 Seacat Scotland
 Seaclipper 16
 Sea Runner
 Stena Lynx III
 Stena Voyager
 Taipan 5.7 
 Tobago 35
 Tarifa Jet
 Topcat K1
 Topcat K2
 Topcat K3
 TriFoiler
 Venezia 42
 WindRider 16
 WindRider Rave

2000s

 ARC 21
 Astus 14.1
 Astus 16.1
 Astus 20.1
 Astus 22
 Aussie 3m
 Belize 43
 Benchijigua Express
 Brady 45
 Catri 23
 Catri 24
 Corsair 28
 Corsair 37
 Dash 750
 Dragonfly 28
 Dragonfly 35
 Dragonfly 920
 Dragonfly 1200
 Ducky 17
 Ducky 19
 Earthrace
 Eleuthera 60
 Explorer 44
 Extreme 40
 Fantasea class
 Farrier F-32
 Farrier F-33
 Farrier F-39
 Farrier F-41
 Formula 18
 Hobie Dragoon 
 Hobie Getaway
 Hobie Wildcat
 Huakai
 Hydroptère
 Incat Tasmania
 HSV-2 Swift
 Independence class
 Lagoon 380
 Lagoon 570
 Lagoon 440
 Lagoon 500
 Lagoon 420
 Lagoon 400
 Lagoon 620
 Lagoon Power 43
 Lagoon Power 44
 Lavezzi 40
 Lipari 41
 M80 Stiletto
 Mahe 36
 MGC 66
 Milenium
 Multi 23
 MV Sorrento
 Nacra Infusion
 Natchan World
 Orana 44
 Orange II
 Sea Fighter
 SL 16
 Spirit of Kangaroo Island
Spitfire
 Sprint 750
 SuperCat class
 Telstar 28
 The Cat
 Type 022
 USAV Spearhead
 Viper F16
 Westpac Express
 Weta
 WindRider 10
 WindRider 17

2010s

 AC45
 AC72
 Alegria 67
 Amatasi 27
 Astus 18.2
 Astus 20.2
 Astus 24
 Atlantic 47
 Baydream 5.5
Brady 57
Brady Pathfinder M Series
 Catri 25
 Catri 27
 Constant Camber DC-3
 Cruze 970
 Dragonfly 32
 Ducky14s
 Ducky16
 Expandacraft Pocketcat
 Farrier F-22
 Farrier F-44
 Farrier F-85
 Flying Phantom Elite
 Flying Phantom Essentiel
 Formula 16
 Francisco
 Galathea 65
 Helia 44
 Ipanema 58
 Klewang
 Lagoon 52
 Lagoon 39
 Lagoon 450
 Lagoon 42-2
 Lagoon 560
 Lagoon 40
 Lagoon 77
 Lagoon 50
 Lagoon 46
 Lagoon 65
 Makar
 M32
 Nacra 17
 Neel 45
 Neel 65
 Planet
 Pulse 600
 Saba 50
 Salina 48
 Sanya 57
 Seacart 26
 Seacart 30
 Seaclipper 20
 Seaclipper 24
 Spearhead
 Topcat 4.5 (K4)
 Topcat Chico
 Tuo Chiang-class corvette
 Victoria 67
 Wavelength 780
 WindRider Rave V

2020s
 Lagoon 55
 Lagoon 51

Brands

 Astusboats (Astus)
 Austal
 Brady Catamarans (Brady)
 Catrigroup
 Corsair Marine
 Dragonfly Trimarans (Dragonfly)
 Ducky
 Expandacraft
 Farrier Marine
 Fountaine-Pajot
 Gunboat (multihull) (Gunboat)
 Hobie
 Incat
 Kværner
 Lagoon catamaran
 Mystère
 Nacra Sailing
 Neel
 Outremer
 Prindle
 Rapido
 Seacart
 Sunreef
 Telstar
 Topcat
 Torpen
 Tricat
 Wavelength
 WindRider

Unsorted

 Cross 18
 Cross 24
 Cross 26
 Cross 36
 Cross 46
 Cross 50
 Cross 52
 Crowther Buccaneer 35
 Farrier F-25
 Farrier F-28
 Fulmar 19
 Hammerhead 54
 RC 27
 RC 30
 Scarab 16
 Scarab 18
 Scarab 22
 Scarab 32
 Scarab 350
 Scarab 650
 Scarab 8
 Skyhook 39
 Stealth F16
 Strike 15
 Strike 16
 Strike 18
 Tri-star 18
 Tri-star 24
 Tri-star 25
 Tri-star 26 MT
 Tri-star 27-9
 Tri-star 31 CM
 Tri-star 31
 Tri-star 32 XR
 Tri-star 35 XR
 Tri-star 35
 Tri-star 36
 Tri-star 37 XRC
 Tri-star 38 / 39
 Tri-star 40 LW
 Tri-star 42
 Tri-star 43 MC
 Tri-star 43 XRC
 Tri-star 44 LW
 Tri-star 45
 Tri-star 49
 Tri-star 50
 Tri-star 51 MC
 Tri-star 54
 Tri-star 60 / 63
 Tri-star 65
 Tri-star 80
 TRiAK
 Trikala 19
 Unicorn
 W17

List